Lwamba Chileshe (born 4 April 1999) is a Zambian-born New Zealand professional squash player. He achieved his highest career PSA ranking of 144 in October 2020 as a part of the 2020-21 PSA World Tour.

References

External links 
Profile at PSA

1999 births
Living people
New Zealand male squash players
People from Ndola
Zambian emigrants to New Zealand